Mead Run is a  long 2nd order tributary to Brokenstraw Creek.  It is classed as a cold water fishery by the Pennsylvania Fish and Boat Commission.

Course
Mead Run rises in Warren County, Pennsylvania about 0.5 miles northeast of Nuttles Rocks and flows southeast to meet Brokenstraw Creek just west of Youngsville.

Watershed
Mead Run drains  of the Pennsylvania High Plateau province and is underlaid by the Venango Formation, Corry Sandstone through Riceville Formation, and the Shenango through Cuyahoga Group. The watershed receives an average of 44.0 in/year of precipitation and has a wetness index of 378.06.  The watershed is about 69% forested.

See also 
 List of rivers of Pennsylvania

References

Rivers of Pennsylvania
Tributaries of the Allegheny River
Rivers of Warren County, Pennsylvania